For Pleasure (14 January 1986 – 18 February 2011) was a Hanoverian horse who competed in international show jumping under riders Lars Nieburg and Marcus Ehning. He won numerous Grand Prix events during his unusually long career, from which he was retired in 2006 at the age of 20.

For Pleasure was born at Robert Diestel's stable in 1986. His dam's line is a collection of prominent sires of show-jumpers and the breeding to Furioso II added sought after refining French blood. A breeding which matched. For Pleasure passed his performance test at Medingen as winner in the jumping test with 145.95 points. Afterwards he was trained by Hans-Joachim Giebel. In 1993 the then seven-year-old celebrated his first win in an open jumper class and became Lower-Saxony Champion. With his new rider Lars Nieberg, For Pleasure's spectacular international career began in 1994.

With rider Lars Nieberg, For Pleasure won gold at the International Championships three times. They went on to win gold at the 1996 Olympic Games in Atlanta. Then in 1999, German rider Marcus Ehning took over the reins and a new dream pair was born. Only seven months after their first start the two won team gold at the European Championships and reached fifth place in the individual ranking. Then in 2000 they won gold with the German team and a brilliant fourth place in the individual ranking at the Olympic Games in Sydney.
With both riders, For Pleasure won 75 S-level classes. In the last eight years of his career, For Pleasure contributed to four championship victories for the German Show Jumping team and won team gold four times.
He won his last Grand Prix in 2004 at the World Cup in Leipzig, Germany. He was 18 years old at the time. He won the class over a massive indoor course, "the highest track I have ever jumped with him indoors" said rider, Marcus Ehning.
He was retired in 2006 at the age of 20, finished his career with staggering lifetime earnings of 1.8 million Euros.

By 2004, For Pleasure had sired 16 approved breeding stallions through and 169 sporthorses.

On February 18, 2011, For Pleasure died on a pasture at the yard of the Ehning family.

Licensing 

For Pleasure completed the Medingen 100-day stallion performance test on August 11, 1989. He was ultimately ranked 15th among 68 peers based on normalized scores. His index of 91.91 placed him 46th in Dressage, while his score of 145.95 placed him 1st in Show jumping. He was also ranked first for rideability.

Pedigree

References 

German show jumping horses
Hanoverian horses
Horses in the Olympics
1986 animal births
2011 animal deaths